Sri Prasanna Venkateswara Swamy Temple is a temple at Appalayagunta, Tirupati located in Tirupati district of Andhra Pradesh, India. The temple is dedicated to Lord Venkateswara, referred to as Prasanna Venkateswara. Unlike other typical Venkateswara temples the presiding deity has its right hand in Abhaya posture.

History
The temple was constructed in 1232 AD by King of Karvetinagaram, Sri Venkata Perumalaraju Brahmadeva Maharaj.

Administration
The temple is being administered by Tirumala Tirupati Devasthanams since 1988.

Festivals

See also
 Hindu Temples in Tirupati
 List of Temples under Tirumala Tirupati Devasthanams(TTD)

References 

Hindu temples in Tirupati district
Tirumala Tirupati Devasthanams
Tirupati
Monuments of National Importance in Andhra Pradesh